The 1908 Cincinnati football team was an American football team that represented the University of Cincinnati as an independent during the 1908 college football season. In their first season under head coach Ralph Inott, the team compiled a 1–4–1 record.  Robert Marx was the team captain. The team played its home games at Carson Field in Cincinnati.

Schedule

References

Cincinnati
Cincinnati Bearcats football seasons
Cincinnati football